Walter R. "Rip" Van Winkle (May 6, 1900 – January 6, 1994) was an American football, basketball, and baseball coach and college athletics administrator. He served as the head football coach at Kentucky Wesleyan College, when its campus was located in Winchester, Kentucky, from 1928 to 1930, compiling a record of 13–11–3. Van Winkle was also the head basketball coach, head baseball coach, and athletic director at Kentucky Wesleyan.

A native of London, Kentucky, Van Winkle played football, basketball, and baseball at Kentucky Wesleyan and Minor League Baseball with the Winchester Dodgers of the Blue Grass League. He left Kentucky Wesleyan in 1932 to become athletic director and head football coach at Highlands High School in Fort Thomas, Kentucky.

Van Winkle died on January 6, 1994, in Milwaukee.

Head coaching record

College football

References

External links
 
 

1900 births
1994 deaths
Baseball shortstops
Cincinnati Bearcats baseball coaches
Cincinnati Bearcats  men's basketball coaches
Kentucky Wesleyan Panthers athletic directors
Kentucky Wesleyan Panthers baseball coaches
Kentucky Wesleyan Panthers baseball players
Kentucky Wesleyan Panthers football coaches
Kentucky Wesleyan Panthers football players
Kentucky Wesleyan Panthers men's basketball coaches
Kentucky Wesleyan Panthers men's basketball players
Miami RedHawks men's basketball coaches
High school football coaches in Kentucky
People from London, Kentucky
Coaches of American football from Kentucky
Players of American football from Kentucky
Baseball coaches from Kentucky
Baseball players from Kentucky
Basketball coaches from Kentucky
Basketball players from Kentucky